The 2017 Superettan is part of the 2017 Swedish football season, and the 17th season of Superettan, Sweden's second-tier football division in its current format. A total of 16 teams contest the league.

Fixtures for the 2017 season were announced on 9 December 2016.

Teams
A total of 16 teams contest the league. The top two teams qualify directly for promotion to Allsvenskan, the third will enter a playoff for the chance of a promotion.

Stadia and locations

 1 According to each club information page at the Swedish Football Association website for Superettan.

League table

Playoffs
The 13th-placed and 14th-placed teams of Superettan meets the two runners-up from 2017 Division 1 (Norra and Södra) in Two-legged ties on a home-and-away basis with the team from Superettan finishing at home.

1–1 on aggregate. IK Frej won on away goals.

Örgryte IS won 4–3 on aggregate.

Positions by round

Season statistics

Top scorers

Top assists

As of 4 November 2017

Top goalkeepers

Hat-tricks

References

Superettan seasons
2017 in Swedish association football leagues
Sweden